Joseph Stephen Repko (March 15, 1920 – March 13, 1997) was an American football coach and player.  He was the head coach at St. John Fisher College in 1972, helping start that program from scratch.

Playing career
Repko was a sophomore on the national champion 1940 Boston College Eagles football team. He went on to play professionally for the Pittsburgh Steelers and the Los Angeles Rams of the National Football League (NFL).

Head coaching record

High school

College

References

External links
 
 

1920 births
1997 deaths
American football tackles
Boston College Eagles football players
Los Angeles Rams players
Pittsburgh Steelers players
St. John Fisher Cardinals football coaches
High school football coaches in Michigan
High school football coaches in New York (state)
People from Carbon County, Pennsylvania
Coaches of American football from Pennsylvania
Players of American football from Pennsylvania